Christopher Ward (London), founded by Christopher Ward, Mike France and Peter Ellis in 2004, is a British watch company. It was the first online-only watch retailer selling timepieces directly to the consumer.

Christopher Ward watches are designed in England and manufactured in Switzerland.

In 2015, The Sunday Times ranked Christopher Ward as 77th in the SME Export Track 100; the only watch company on the list.

In January 2020, it was announced that co-founder Christopher Ward had left the business. His involvement in a new watch brand, TRIBUS, was announced in September 2020. TRIBUS ceased operations and filed for insolvency in the summer of 2022.

History 
Christopher Ward was founded by Christopher Ward, Mike France and Peter Ellis on a boat on the River Thames in 2004.

Christopher Ward released their first watch in 2005. By December of that year, influential watch bloggers were writing more about Christopher Ward than Rolex on the site TimeZone.

The company was announced as the official timing partner of the Bluebird speed record team in 2012.

For the company's 10th anniversary in 2014, it merged with Swiss manufacturing partners Synergies Horlogères SA to create Christopher Ward London Holdings Ltd. This culminated in the launch of Christopher Ward's first in-house movement, Calibre SH21, in July 2014. Conceived and designed over four years by Christopher Ward's watchmaker, Johannes Jahnke, the SH21 is entirely Swiss made. This release was said to be "probably the most important development by a British watch brand in the past 50 years."

Christopher Ward London was the only watch company to rank in The Sunday Times SME Export Track 100, ranking 77th in 2015.

In January 2020, it was announced that Christopher Ward had left the brand. He was later announced as a director of TRIBUS, a new watch brand he had founded alongside his three sons, Jonathon, James and Jake.

Business Model 
From its launch in 2004, the company was established as the "world's first exclusively online luxury watch brand." Christopher Ward cut out retailers by selling directly to consumers. Due to the saving of traditional marketing and distribution costs, Christopher Ward watches are sold with lower margins for a more transparent price according to the company. The brand combines technical quality and value.

In addition to using the internet for sales, Christopher Ward handles customer service requests through an online form. Once service requirements are determined, the watch is sent to technicians at Christopher Ward.

A differentiating factor of Christopher Ward is their "60|60 guarantee." This plan entails a 60-day free return and a 60-month movement guarantee on watches purchased on their site.

In the year ended March 31, 2020, the company claimed a 19% growth in revenue to reach approximately £10 million, with an annual production of roughly 20,000 watches.  For 2020 total, the company stated sales of "about £15m" for an increase of 30% over the previous year.

Showrooms 
Christopher Ward watches are only available online, via telephone and from the company's showroom in Maidenhead, Berkshire. A showroom in Nashua, New Hampshire (USA) was closed in March 2016.

The CW Challenger Programme 
While Christopher Ward does not sponsor sports teams, the company has set up the Christopher Ward Challenger programme to support young talent with world class potential.

The programme started when a team of recent graduates asked for help with their plan to climb a new peak in Tajikistan. The peak has been named after the company and is now known as Mount Christopher Ward.

Since then, the Challenger programme has been expanded and now includes; Amber Hill, Britain's youngest and highest performing talent in women's Skeet shooting, European champion 2015; Sam Brearey, GB yachtsman and Fireball class world champion Will Satch Olympic medallist GB rower; Samantha Kinghorn, Paralympic athlete in the T35 class; and filmmaker Chris Loizou.

Infringement allegations

On 16 September 2018, it was reported that Jaguar would take Christopher Ward to court over alleged trademark infringement.

References

External links

 http://wornandwound.com/2014/07/03/introducing-christopher-ward-sh21-game-changer/
 https://www.telegraph.co.uk/finance/festival-of-business/11057329/British-watchmaker-launches-movement-against-Swiss-monopoly.html
 https://web.archive.org/web/20141010200323/http://www.watchpro.com/16634-christopher-ward-marks-10-years-with-sh21-calibre/
 Christopher Ward Watch Reviews
 Watch Ya Gonna Do About It Christopher Ward Watch Reviews

Watch manufacturing companies of the United Kingdom
British companies established in 2004
Manufacturing companies established in 2004
Watch brands